Blue Chip Stamps v. Manor Drug Stores, 421 U.S. 723 (1975), was a decision by the United States Supreme Court, which ruled that only those suffering direct loss from the purchase or sale of stock had standing to sue under federal securities law. The Court noted that under the Securities Exchange Act of 1934, derivative investors are considered buyers or sellers of securities for application of SEC Rule 10b-5.

See also
List of United States Supreme Court cases, volume 421

Further reading

References

External links
 

1975 in United States case law
United States securities case law
United States Supreme Court cases
United States Supreme Court cases of the Burger Court